Mario Vecchi (born 4 September 1957) is an Italian former judoka. He competed at the 1976 Summer Olympics and the 1984 Summer Olympics.

References

External links
 

1957 births
Living people
Italian male judoka
Olympic judoka of Italy
Judoka at the 1976 Summer Olympics
Judoka at the 1984 Summer Olympics
People from Rieti
Sportspeople from the Province of Rieti